Aleksandra Markovna Zakharova (born 17 June 1962) is a Soviet and Russian actress, daughter of famous film director Mark Zakharov and actress Nina Lapshinova. Zakharova has been awarded the State Prize of the Russian Federation in 1996 and 2002. She is a People's Artist of Russia. She was also awarded Order of Honour (2007) and Order For Merit to the Fatherland, 4th degree (2013).

Filmography 
 The House That Swift Built (Дом, который построил Свифт, 1982) as Stella (Esther Johnson)
 Formula of Love (Формула любви, 1984) as Fimka
 Criminal Talent (Криминальный талант, 1988)  as Alexandra Rukoyatkina
 To Kill a Dragon (Убить дракона, 1988) as Elsa
 The Master and Margarita (Мастер и Маргарита, 1994) as Hella

References

External links
 

1962 births
Living people
Soviet film actresses
Soviet television actresses
Soviet stage actresses
Russian film actresses
Russian television actresses
Russian stage actresses
Actresses from Moscow
20th-century Russian actresses
21st-century Russian actresses
Recipients of the Order of Honour (Russia)
People's Artists of Russia
Honored Artists of the Russian Federation
State Prize of the Russian Federation laureates